Spirit of the Dragon (龍在江湖 李小龍傳奇) is a Hong Kong TV series based on famous martial artist Bruce Lee.  The 30 episode series was released on ATV in 1992.

Synopsis
The story begins with the young Bruce Lee (David Wu) as a martial artist trying to make it big.  He tries his best to expand martial arts via his entertainment career. He later meets Linda (Gwennie Tam) and develop a relationship.  Overall the story has been rated about 30% based on real facts, and the other 70% of created materials.

Cast

See also
 Media about Bruce Lee

References

Asia Television original programming
Cultural depictions of Bruce Lee
1992 Hong Kong television series debuts
1992 Hong Kong television series endings
Martial arts television series